Boris Milekić (born 29 September 1988) is a Serbian football defender.

References

External links
 
 Boris Milekić stats at utakmica.rs

1988 births
Living people
Sportspeople from Užice
Association football defenders
Serbian footballers
Serbian expatriate footballers
FK Loznica players
FK Mačva Šabac players
FK Sloboda Užice players
FK Radnički Niš players
FK Inđija players
FK Donji Srem players
FK Jedinstvo Užice players
FK Kolubara players
FK Proleter Novi Sad players
FK Metalac Gornji Milanovac players
NK Žepče players
Stal Mielec players
Serbian SuperLiga players
I liga players
Serbian expatriate sportspeople in Poland
Expatriate footballers in Poland